The 2021 season in Ecuadorian football includes all the matches of the different national male and female teams, as well as the local club tournaments, and the participation of these in international competitions in which representatives of the country's teams will participate.

National teams

Ecuador national football team

Kits

Friendly matches

2022 FIFA World Cup qualification

2021 Copa América

Group B

Knockout stage

CONMEBOL competitions

CONMEBOL Copa Libertadores

Qualifying stages

First qualifying stage

|}

Second qualifying stage

|}

Third qualifying stage

|}

Group stage

Group A

Group C

Group G

Knockout phase

Round of 16

|}

Quarter-finals

|}

CONMEBOL Copa Sudamericana

First stage

|}

Group stage

Group D

Group G

Final phase

Round of 16

|}

Men's football

League season

Serie A
First stage

Second stage

Aggregate table

Serie B

Segunda Categoría

Copa Ecuador
The 2021 Copa Ecuador would have been held from the third week of August, but the tournament was cancelled after the company which held the broadcasting rights alleged problems.

Supercopa Ecuador

Final

Notes

References

Football in Ecuador